Mindel Cherniack Sheps (May 20, 1913 – January 13, 1973) was a Canadian physician, biostatistician and demographer. She held academic appointments at Harvard Medical School, University of Pittsburgh, Columbia University and UNC Chapel Hill, where she was Professor of Biostatistics.

Biography 
Sheps was born in Winnipeg, Manitoba in 1913. Her parents, Joseph and Fanya (Golden) Cherniack, were immigrants from southern Russia, and her brother, Saul Cherniack, became minister of finance in the Manitoba provincial government in the early 1970s. She married Cecil George Sheps in 1937.

After obtaining her medical degree at the University of Manitoba 1936, she went into general practice from 1939 to 1944, and ran successfully for the Winnipeg School Board in 1942. From 1944 to 1946, she was secretary to the health services planning commission of the government of Saskatchewan. In that position, Sheps was a key contributor to the Sigerist Report, which led to Saskatchewan enacting the first government hospital insurance plan in North America in 1945.

Later, after a move to Chapel Hill, North Carolina, she began to study biostatistics, and held faculty positions at several universities before returning to UNC Chapel Hill in 1968, where she remained until her death in 1973. In addition to her academic career, she served as an adviser to the Government of India through the Ford Foundation, and held an advisory role at World Health Organization.

Research 
Sheps' work has had significant influence on several academic fields. In epidemiology and biostatistics, Sheps' 1958 paper "Shall we count the living or the dead" contains one of the earliest discussions of challenges that arise from the asymmetry of the relative risk, a phenomenon that may make the effect estimate sensitive to whether it is based on the probability of the outcome, or the probability of not having the outcome.

She devoted the last ten years of her life primarily to demography, a field in which she was largely self taught. Her work in demography was among the first to study the determinants of variation in family formation. The Mindel C. Sheps award in mathematical demography is named in her honor.

Selected publications 
 Sheps, M.C. (1958): "Shall we count the living or the dead?". New England Journal of Medicine 259:1210-1214.
 Sheps, M.C., and Menken, J. A. "Mathematical Models of Conception and Birth". Chicago: University of Chicago Press, 1973.

References 

1913 births
1973 deaths
Biostatisticians
Canadian demographers
Canadian women physicians
people from Winnipeg
University of Manitoba alumni
University of North Carolina alumni
University of North Carolina faculty
Canadian emigrants to the United States